Carl Bismarck Roden (June 7, 1871 – October 25, 1956) was an American librarian and served as chief librarian of the Chicago Public Library from 1918 to 1950. A lifelong resident of Norwood Park, Illinois he began work as a library page in 1886.

Under his leadership, the Chicago Public Library system doubled its reach in the community and tripled the number of books it offered. Circulation from branch libraries doubled and the community support for the Public Libraries increased four-fold. During his tenure, Chicago Public Library's Board of Directors authorized the first intellectual freedom policy in an American public Library. The April 1936 action responded to challenges from community members of Russian and Polish descent regarding the collections provided by the Chicago Public Library's Foreign Language Department.

Roden served as the president of the American Library Association from 1927 to 1928.

Bibliography
  “Standards for the Public Library Book Collection,” in The Library of Tomorrow: A Symposium, ed. Emily M. Danton (Chicago: American Library Association, 1939), 94.
  “The Library as a Censor of Books,” in Proceedings of the Illinois Library Association, October 19–21 (Springfield: Illinois Library Association, 1922), 167.

See also
 Chicago Public Library
 intellectual freedom

References

 

1871 births

1956 deaths
American librarians
Chicago Public Library